A Stainless Steel Rat is Born is a novel by Harry Harrison published in 1985.

Plot summary
A Stainless Steel Rat is Born is a novel in which the young Slippery Jim DiGriz finds himself getting into jail and out again in search of criminal contacts.

Reception
Dave Langford reviewed A Stainless Steel Rat is Born for White Dwarf #77, and stated that "No sequel will match the saga's first book, but this comes close: Jim's family isn't around to get in his light, the action doesn't get so excessively silly or grim as to fragment the story, and it climaxes on one of those ghastly low-tech planets in which Harrison delights."

Reviews
Review by Don D'Ammassa (1986) in Science Fiction Chronicle, #77 February 1986
Review by Tom Easton (1986) in Analog Science Fiction/Science Fact, February 1986

References

1985 novels